Sarsaparilla often refers to the sarsaparilla soft drink, made from Smilax plants.

Sarsaparilla may also refer to:

Biology
Several species of plants, of the genus Smilax, including:
Smilax ornata, also known as Honduran or Jamaican sarsaparilla
Smilax aristolochiifolia, known as Mexican sarsaparilla
Smilax aspera, a flowering vine found in southern Europe, Africa and south Asia
Smilax glyciphylla, sweet sarsaparilla, native to Eastern Australia
Smilax officinalis

Other plant species known by the same name include:
Alphitonia, known as sarsaparilla in Australia
Hardenbergia violacea, known as sarsaparilla in Australia
Aralia nudicaulis, known as wild sarsaparilla
Hemidesmus indicus, or Indian sarsaparilla

See also
Sassparilla (band), a roots-rock band based in Portland, Oregon.
Jade and Sarsaparilla, American musical act of the 1970s

References